The 2021 BNP Paribas Open (also known as the 2021 Indian Wells Masters) was a professional men's and women's tennis tournament played in Indian Wells, California. After the event was cancelled the preceding year amid the beginning of the COVID-19 pandemic, the event was initially scheduled to take place on March 10–21, 2021, but was postponed to October 6–17, 2021 to accommodate logistics disruptions owing to the pandemic.

It was the 47th edition of the men's event and 32nd of the women's event, and was classified as an ATP Tour Masters 1000 event on the 2021 ATP Tour and a WTA 1000 event on the 2021 WTA Tour. Both the men's and the women's qualifying and main draw events took place at the Indian Wells Tennis Garden from October 4 through October 17, 2021 on outdoor hard courts.

Dominic Thiem was the defending men's singles champion from when the tournament was last held in 2019. However, after Thiem ended his season early due to an ongoing wrist injury, he withdrew from the tournament. Cameron Norrie won the men's singles title to become the first British man to win the Indian Wells Masters and earn his first ATP Masters 1000 title. Bianca Andreescu was the defending women's singles champion from 2019, but she lost in the third round to Anett Kontaveit. Paula Badosa won the women's singles title to become the first Spanish woman to win the Indian Wells Masters and earn her first WTA 1000 title.

The teams of Nikola Mektić and Horacio Zeballos and Elise Mertens and Aryna Sabalenka were the defending champions in the men's and women's doubles draws, respectively. Mektić and Zeballos chose not to participate together. Mektić played alongside partner Mate Pavić as the top seeds, but the pair lost in the quarterfinals. Zeballos played alongside partner Marcel Granollers, but were eliminated in the first round. Sabalenka chose not to defend her title and Mertens entered alongside partner Hsieh Su-wei. Mertens successfully defended her title with Hsieh, making it Mertens' second and Hsieh's third Indian Wells title, respectively.

Champions

Men's singles

  Cameron Norrie def.  Nikoloz Basilashvili, 3–6, 6–4, 6–1

Women's singles

  Paula Badosa def.  Victoria Azarenka, 7–6(7–5), 2–6, 7–6(7–2)

This was Badosa's second WTA Tour singles title, and first at the WTA 1000 level.

Men's doubles

  John Peers /  Filip Polášek def.  Aslan Karatsev /  Andrey Rublev, 6–3, 7–6(7–5)

Women's doubles

  Hsieh Su-wei /  Elise Mertens def.  Veronika Kudermetova /  Elena Rybakina, 7–6(7–1), 6–3

Points and prize money

Point distribution

Prize money

ATP singles main-draw entrants

Seeds
The following are the seeded players. Seedings are based on ATP rankings as of October 4, 2021. Rank and points before are as of October 4, 2021.

As a result of pandemic-related adjustments to the ranking system, players are defending their points from the 2019 tournament (which had already been reduced by 50%), as well as from tournaments held during the weeks of 7 and 14 October 2019 (Shanghai, Stockholm, Antwerp and/or Moscow) and 12 October 2020 (St. Petersburg, Cologne or Sardinia). Points from 2019 and 2020 tournaments are included in the table only if they counted towards the player's ranking as of October 4, 2021.

† The player is not defending points from either 2019 or 2020. Accordingly, his 19th best result is shown in this column instead.
^ Because the 2021 tournament is non-mandatory, the player substituted his 19th best result in place of the points won in this tournament.

Other entrants
The following players received wildcards into the singles main draw:
  Andy Murray
  Holger Rune
  Jack Sock
  Zachary Svajda
  J. J. Wolf

The following player received entry using a protected ranking into the singles main draw:
  Philipp Kohlschreiber

The following players received entry from the qualifying draw:
  Salvatore Caruso
  Maxime Cressy
  Ernesto Escobedo
  Christopher Eubanks
  Emilio Gómez
  Cem İlkel
  Roberto Marcora
  Renzo Olivo
  João Sousa
  Alejandro Tabilo
  Botic van de Zandschulp
  Aleksandar Vukic

Withdrawals
Before the tournament
  Aljaž Bedene → replaced by  Daniel Altmaier
  Alexander Bublik → replaced by  Carlos Taberner
  Jérémy Chardy → replaced by  Thiago Monteiro
  Marin Čilić → replaced by  Jenson Brooksby
  Borna Ćorić → replaced by  Guido Pella
  Pablo Cuevas → replaced by  Roberto Carballés Baena
  Novak Djokovic → replaced by  Feliciano López
  Roger Federer → replaced by  Philipp Kohlschreiber
  David Goffin → replaced by  Egor Gerasimov
  Ugo Humbert → replaced by  Steve Johnson
  Ilya Ivashka → replaced by  Daniel Elahi Galán
  Rafael Nadal → replaced by  Brandon Nakashima
  Milos Raonic → replaced by  Denis Kudla
  Dominic Thiem → replaced by  Facundo Bagnis
  Stan Wawrinka → replaced by  Tennys Sandgren
  Mikael Ymer → replaced by  Taro Daniel

During the tournament
  John Isner

ATP doubles main-draw entrants

Seeds

Rankings are as of October 4, 2021.

Other entrants
The following pairs received wildcards into the doubles main draw:
  John Isner /  Jack Sock
  Steve Johnson /  Sam Querrey
  Mackenzie McDonald /  Brandon Nakashima

The following pair received entry as alternates:
  Filip Krajinović /  Dušan Lajović

Withdrawals
Before the tournament
  Matteo Berrettini /  Jannik Sinner → replaced by  Filip Krajinović /  Dušan Lajović
  Marcelo Demoliner /  Daniil Medvedev → replaced by  Cristian Garín /  Santiago González

During the tournament
  John Isner /  Jack Sock

WTA singles main-draw entrants

Seeds
The following are the seeded players. Seedings are based on WTA rankings as of September 27, 2021. Rankings and points before are as of October 4, 2021.

As a result of pandemic-related adjustments to the ranking system and changes to the WTA Tour calendar in 2020 and 2021, players will have the following potential adjustments to their ranking points after the tournament:
 players who have points from the 2020 French Open counting towards their ranking on October 4, 2021, will have those points replaced by points from the 2021 French Open;
 players will be dropping points from tournaments held during the weeks of 7 and 14 October 2019 (Tianjin, Linz, Moscow and Luxembourg); and
 players who are not defending points from October 2019 will have their 16th best result replaced by their points from the 2021 Indian Wells tournament.

Points from the 2019 Indian Wells tournament will be dropped on November 8, 2021.

† Only players who were counting their 2020 French Open points in their rankings as of October 4, 2021 are shown in these columns.

Other entrants
The following players received wildcards into the singles main draw:
  Kim Clijsters
  Elsa Jacquemot
  Ashlyn Krueger
  Claire Liu
  Caty McNally
  Emma Raducanu
  Katrina Scott
  Katie Volynets

The following players received entry using a protected ranking into the singles main draw:
  Zheng Saisai

The following players received entry from the qualifying draw:
  Usue Maitane Arconada
  Zarina Diyas
  Kirsten Flipkens
  Magdalena Fręch
  Mai Hontama
  Anna Kalinskaya
  Kateryna Kozlova
  Liang En-shuo
  Alycia Parks
  Elena-Gabriela Ruse
  Astra Sharma
  Martina Trevisan

The following players received entry as lucky losers:
  Beatriz Haddad Maia
  Kristína Kučová
  Jasmine Paolini

Withdrawals
Before the tournament
  Ekaterina Alexandrova → replaced by  Marie Bouzková
  Ashleigh Barty → replaced by  Polona Hercog
  Belinda Bencic → replaced by  Kristína Kučová
  Jennifer Brady → replaced by  María Camila Osorio Serrano
  Sofia Kenin → replaced by  Ana Konjuh
  Johanna Konta → replaced by  Hsieh Su-wei
  Caty McNally → replaced by  Jasmine Paolini
  Kristina Mladenovic → replaced by  Nuria Párrizas Díaz
  Karolína Muchová → replaced by  Aliaksandra Sasnovich
  Naomi Osaka → replaced by  Misaki Doi
  Nadia Podoroska → replaced by  Beatriz Haddad Maia
  Aryna Sabalenka → replaced by  Lauren Davis
  Alison Van Uytvanck → replaced by  Mayar Sherif
  Elena Vesnina → replaced by  Anna Karolína Schmiedlová
  Serena Williams → replaced by  Madison Brengle

WTA doubles main-draw entrants

Seeds

Rankings are as of September 27, 2021.

Other entrants
The following pairs received wildcards into the doubles main draw:
  Amanda Anisimova /  Dayana Yastremska
  Reese Brantmeier /  Katrina Scott
  Simona Halep /  Elena-Gabriela Ruse

The following pairs received entry using protected rankings:
  Nao Hibino /  Alicja Rosolska
  Julia Lohoff /  Alexandra Panova
  Anastasia Rodionova /  Arina Rodionova
  Heather Watson /  Zheng Saisai

Withdrawals
Before the tournament
  Anna Blinkova /  Aliaksandra Sasnovich → replaced by  Ulrikke Eikeri /  Aliaksandra Sasnovich
  Caroline Garcia /  Kristina Mladenovic → replaced by  Kirsten Flipkens /  Sara Sorribes Tormo

See also 

 2021 ATP Tour
 ATP Tour Masters 1000
 List of ATP Tour top-level tournament singles champions
 Tennis Masters Series records and statistics

 2021 WTA Tour
 WTA 1000 tournaments
 WTA Premier Mandatory/5
 List of WTA Tour top-level tournament singles champions

References

External links

 
2021 BNP Paribas Open
2021 ATP Tour
2021 WTA Tour
2021 in American tennis
October 2021 sports events in the United States
2021 in sports in California
Tennis events postponed due to the COVID-19 pandemic